ISIPCA (Institut supérieur international du parfum, de la cosmétique et de l'aromatique alimentaire) is a French school for post-graduate studies in perfume, cosmetics products and food flavor formulation, with an apprenticeship period in the industry. It was founded in 1970 by Jean-Jacques Guerlain as ISIP (Institut supérieur international du parfum). It became Groupe ISIPCA in 1984 when the CCIV (Chambre de commerce et d'industrie de Versailles-Val-d'Oise-Yvelines) backed up and sponsored the school with significant capital.

From 2004 to 2017, ISIPCA and UVSQ (University of Versailles) had established a partnership in order to offer postgraduate programmes (Bachelor's degree Diplomas and Professional Masters) in perfumery, cosmetics and food flavoring.

The school is affiliated with the Osmothèque, a perfume archive that researches ancient perfumes, and reconstructs fragrances whose formulas have been lost.

The facilities are a mix of renovated ancient buildings, protected by Historic Landmark status, and contemporary architecture by parisian architects Philippe Ameller and Jacques Dubois (2004).

Notable alumni 
 Francis Kurkdjian, French contemporary perfumer and businessman
 Annick Ménardo, Contemporary perfumer

See also 
 Flavorist
 Perfumer
 Université Européenne des Senteurs & Saveurs

References

External links 
 ISIPCA Official website

Universities and colleges in Versailles
Versailles Saint-Quentin-en-Yvelines University
Educational institutions established in 1970
Perfumery
Cosmetics companies of France
1970 establishments in France